Pippa Hackett (born January 1974) is an Irish Green Party politician who has served as a Minister of State at the Department of Agriculture, Food and the Marine since June 2020. She is one of three Ministers of State in attendance at cabinet, but without a vote. She has been a Senator for the Agricultural Panel since November 2019.

Political career
She joined the Green Party in around 2016, upon the recommendation of a neighbour of hers, Christopher Fettes, the party founder. She is a former member of Offaly County Council.

She was elected unopposed, as a Senator for the Agricultural Panel in a by-election on 1 November 2019. The vacancy was caused by the election of Senator Grace O'Sullivan to the European Parliament in May 2019.

She was an unsuccessful Green party candidate for the Laois–Offaly constituency at the 2020 general election, being eliminated at the final count with 4,255 votes.

At the 2020 Seanad election on 30 March, she was re-elected to the Agricultural Panel. On the formation of a new government on 27 June 2020 between Fianna Fáil, Fine Gael and the Green Party, she was appointed as Minister of State at the Department of Agriculture, Food and the Marine with responsibility for Land Use and Biodiversity. She became the first senator to be appointed as a Minister of State and is one of three Ministers of State attending cabinet, a position commonly known as a super junior minister.

On 24 March 2021, Hackett was one of three Green Party senators to table a motion of no confidence against party chairperson Hazel Chu, after Chu announced her candidacy in a Seanad by-election as an independent.

Early life and education
Hackett was born in Galway, but is a native of Ballindine, County Mayo. During her time in Britain, she studied Equine Science at Aberystwyth University and Agriculture at the University of Essex. Back in Ireland, she studied Graduate Equine Science at University College Dublin, and gained her PhD in Sports Biomechanics at the University of Limerick.

Personal life
Hackett lives on a farm in County Offaly near Geashill with her husband Mark, whom she met at university in Essex, and their four children. Her husband was co-opted to take her seat on Offaly County Council.

References

External links
Pippa Hackett's page on the Green Party website

1974 births
Living people
Alumni of Aberystwyth University
Alumni of the University of Essex
Alumni of University College Dublin
Alumni of the University of Limerick
Green Party (Ireland) senators
Local councillors in County Offaly
Politicians from County Mayo
Members of the 25th Seanad
Members of the 26th Seanad
21st-century women members of Seanad Éireann
Ministers of State of the 33rd Dáil
Women ministers of state of the Republic of Ireland